The accesso ShoWare Center is a multi-purpose arena in Kent, Washington, United States.

About the venue
The construction of the arena began September 2005, with the venue opening in January 2009. The principal tenants are the Seattle Thunderbirds of the Western Hockey League and the Tacoma Stars of the Major Arena Soccer League. 

Naming rights to the arena were initially sold to Amiga, Inc. and the arena was to be called the "Amiga Center".  However, Amiga failed to make a promised down payment, and lost the naming rights as of August 2007. In November 2008, the Kent City Council announced that the city had sold the naming rights to the Fresno-based VisionOne, Inc., an e-business software developer which in turn named the arena after ShoWare, its flagship box office operations program. In 2014, tech company Accesso purchased VisionOne, Inc.; with the venue changing its name to the accesso ShoWare Center in the fall of 2017. 

The design architect is LMN Architects of Seattle, in association with PBK Architects of Vancouver, British Columbia. The arena is managed and operated by Philadelphia-based SMG.

Among other events, it has hosted the 2012 edition of the Hilton HHonors Skate America.

Facts about the venue
Miscellaneous
The approximate square footage of the arena is 
The "Chandelier" scoreboard has four 6' x 12' video screens.
The venue opened on January 3, 2009 with a hockey game by (Seattle Thunderbirds vs. Everett Silvertips) 
The arena has a capacity of 5,887 seats. Retractable seating to provide additional space for concerts, basketball, shows and other events, expanding the capacity to 7,141.
The venue typically hosts 110 to 117 events annually, including about 40 Thunderbird games.
Country duo Florida Georgia Line drew an audience 7,129 people on December 14, 2013.
The 2 millionth guest celebration was held on November 11, 2014.

Sports
Brenden Silvester of the Seattle Thunderbirds scored the first goal in the history of the arena, in the 2nd period on January 3, 2009 against the Everett Silvertips in a 4-3 Seattle win.
Greg Scott of the Seattle Thunderbirds scored the first hat trick in the arena on February 6, 2009
The 2015-2016 hockey season reached an all time attendance record with an average of 4,792 people per game.
Hockey single game attendance record of 6,223 set on May 12, 2017 during the WHL finals against the Regina Pats.
Hosted first professional basketball games during the 2018 JBA season.
In Professional Wrestling, the arena has hosted three house shows for the TNA Wrestling promotion (2009, 2011, 2012) and one taped event for Ring of Honor wrestling's weekly television program (2019).
The arena hosted a National Hockey League preseason game between the Seattle Kraken and Calgary Flames on October 2, 2021.

Selected events

References

Indoor ice hockey venues in the United States
Indoor soccer venues in the United States
Indoor arenas in Washington (state)
Music venues in Washington (state)
Sports venues in Kent, Washington
Western Hockey League arenas
Buildings and structures in King County, Washington
Tourist attractions in King County, Washington
2009 establishments in Washington (state)
Sports venues completed in 2009